Sankya is a 2006 novel by the Russian writer Zakhar Prilepin. Sankya is a story about Sasha Tishin, member of The Founders - revolutionary organization, similar to National Bolshevik Party. 

This novel was published in 2006 in Ad Marginem (Russia).

Characters
 Sasha Tishin Sankya
 Yana
 Bezletov
 Kostenko
 Matvey
 Nega 
 Posik 
 Rogov  
 Verochka

Prizes And Awards
 Evrika-Prize (2006)
 Yasnaya Polyana Award (2007)

Translations
Sankya has been translated into Chinese, Polish, French, Serbian, Romanian, Italian, German, Hungarian, Danish English and Greek.

Adaptations
 Otmorozki (Отморозки, literally, Thugs)

See also
 2006 in literature
 Russian literature

References

External links
 Sankya - official website
 Zahar Prilepin - official website
 Zakhar Prilepin: a modern Leo Tolstoy
 Contemporary Russian Literary Fiction

Novels by Zakhar Prilepin
2006 novels
21st-century Russian novels
Novels set in Russia
Novels about rebels
Novels about revolutionaries
National Bolshevism